Gil Saúl Alcalá Barba (born 29 July 1992) is a Mexican professional footballer who plays as a goalkeeper for Liga MX club Querétaro, on loan from Tijuana.

Club career

UNAM (loan) 
On 1 July 2022, Alcalá was loaned out to Liga MX club UNAM for one year.

Career statistics

Club

References

External links

 

Liga MX players
Living people
Footballers from Jalisco
1992 births
Association football goalkeepers
Querétaro F.C. footballers
Mexican footballers